Rohit Shyam Raut (born 18 November 1995) is an Indian singer and music director, who primarily works in the Marathi film industry. He appeared in the Indian singing reality show Indian Idol and was the runner-up of its eleventh season.

Personal life 
Rohit Shyam Raut was born on 18 November 1995 in Latur. He completed his secondary education at Shri Deshikendra School. Raut lives with his father Shyam Raut, who works as the cultural head of the Nationalist Congress Party, Latur District, and younger brother Yugal Raut, who owns a sales business. In 2022, Raut married his longtime girlfriend Juilee Joglekar, who is also a singer.

Career 
Earlier in his life, Raut started participating in district, state, and national level music competitions. He was selected at Sa Re Ga Ma Pa L'il Champs Marathi on Zee Marathi and started to gain popularity from the show. He was one of the finalists of the show and was known as "Future Music Director". He made his debut from the song Yaara Yaara in Duniyadari. After that, he appeared in many Marathi films including Triple Seat, Muramba, and Ti Saddhya Kay Karte.

The 2019 film Mogra Phulaalaa, marked Raut's debut as a music director. He has won couple of awards at the Mirchi Music Awards Marathi and was nominated for the best playback singer at the Filmfare Marathi Awards 2020 for the song Manmohini.

He sang most of the title tracks and songs of TV shows like Ka Re Durava, Sang Tu Aahes Ka, Majha Hoshil Na, Yeu Kashi Tashi Mi Nandayla, Pasant Aahe Mulgi, Dil Dosti Duniyadari, etc. Raut participated and became popular from his appearance on the eleventh season of Indian Idol, where he was the runner-up of the show.

Discography

References

External links 
 Rohit Raut on IMDb
 Rohit Raut on Bollywood Hungama

1995 births
Living people
21st-century Indian male singers
21st-century Indian singers
Indian Idol participants
Marathi playback singers
People from Latur district
Singers from Maharashtra